Crawford College, La Lucia is a school in La Lucia, uMhlanga, KwaZulu-Natal, South Africa. This campus of the Crawford Schools was established in 1999.

History 
The first Crawford School opened its doors in January 1993 in Killarney, Johannesburg. From their first year, the Crawford Colleges produced the top Matric results in Gauteng and Kwazulu-Natal.

In 1996 three more schools were added to the group and today the group has eighteen of the top schools in South Africa.

Crawford Schools became a part of the Schools Division of ADvTECH Ltd, a JSE listed company, in 1998. This ensures financial stability, academic quality control and ongoing investment.

In 2017, 109 students took the Independent Examinations Board Matric class; all passed, meeting the required standard to begin a Bachelor's degree. The same year, the school's drumline participate at the Hilton Arts Festival.

References

External links
Crawford College, La Lucia official site

Private schools in KwaZulu-Natal
1999 establishments in South Africa
Educational institutions established in 1999